"Don't Need a Gun" is a song by Billy Idol from his 1986 studio album Whiplash Smile. It became the album's second single in 1987.

Background and writing 
"Don't Need a Gun" was written by Billy Idol. The song has a clear content about the risk of using firearms.

The chorus of the song includes references to "Tutti Frutti", "Flip, Flop and Fly" and "Lawdy Miss Clawdy".  The final verse name-checks Elvis Presley, Johnnie Ray and Gene Vincent.

Charts

References

External links 
 "Don't Need a Gun" at Discogs

1986 songs
1987 singles
Songs written by Billy Idol
Billy Idol songs
Chrysalis Records singles
Song recordings produced by Keith Forsey